Thomas Howell Slade Jr. (13 March 1936 – 20 October 2014) was an American politician, legislator, lobbyist, and businessman.

Background
Slade was born in Albany, Georgia and grew up in Clay County, Florida and went to school in Starke, Florida. He was chairman of Dozier and Gay Industrial Sealing. Slade served in the Florida House of Representatives in 1962, as a Democrat, and then switched to the Republican Party when he was elected to the Florida State Senate in 1966. In 1990, Slade served as chairman of the Florida Tax and Budget Commission. He died in Orange Park, Florida of heart failure.

He served as Chairman of the Republican Party of Florida, for three consecutive terms from January 1993 to January 1999. He was the chairman of the Republican Party of Duval County, Florida from 2002 to 2004. He ran for the Chairmanship of the Republican National Committee unsuccessfully in 1998. He was the CEO and Chairman of Tidewater Consulting.

References

External links
Former Republican Party of Florida Chair Tom Slade dies at 78
Tidewater Consulting

|-

1936 births
2014 deaths
People from Albany, Georgia
People from Orange Park, Florida
Politicians from Jacksonville, Florida
Businesspeople from Florida
Florida Democrats
Florida Republicans
Members of the Florida House of Representatives
Florida state senators
American lobbyists
State political party chairs of Florida
20th-century American businesspeople